A Boy Named Goo is the fifth studio album by American rock band Goo Goo Dolls, released in 1995 on Warner Bros. As a commercial success, it has been RIAA-certified as double-platinum.

History
This is the Goo Goo Dolls' last studio album with George Tutuska on drums; he was replaced by Mike Malinin just before the album was released. This album is the Goo Goo Dolls' first studio album to not have 14 tracks. The song "Stand Alone" was written by George Tutuska, and because John Rzeznik didn't want to exploit George's efforts after his dismissal, the song was only included on a promo version of the album. On the wide-release version, it is replaced with "Disconnected" and "Slave Girl", which were initially B-sides to the "Only One" single. On the same promo, "Ain't That Unusual" was labeled as "Someday". The two replacement songs are covers of songs by defunct Buffalo and Sydney punk bands The Enemies and Lime Spiders.

The song "Name" is well known as the Goo Goo Dolls' first hit. According to lead singer John Rzeznik, the song's unusual composition came about "quite accidentally".

This album also marked the band's last with the Metal Blade Records imprint.

Walmart controversy
On June 5, 1996, the band's label, Warner Bros., released a statement claiming that Walmart had decided to stop selling A Boy Named Goo because some Walmart customers had complained that the album cover was offensive. The statement claimed that some customers had incorrectly thought that the child on the cover was smeared in blood rather than blackberry juice. Walmart acknowledged that they had decided to stop selling the album, but denied Warner Bros.'s claim that this was because of complaints about the cover art, instead ascribing the decision to weak sales. Of the reports that Walmart customers had thought that the child on the cover was smeared in blood, Rzeznik said, "The name of the album is A Boy Named Goo. The picture is of a boy covered with goo. What part of this concept are they unclear on?"

Track listing 
All songs written by John Rzeznik, except where noted.

Original track listing
The track listing for advance copies—before George Tutuska was fired from the band—was slightly different.

Covers and media appearances
Haste the Day, a metalcore band, covered the song "Long Way Down" for their album When Everything Falls.

The song "Ain't That Unusual" was featured on the soundtrack of the 1995 film Angus. A remix of the song "Long Way Down" was also featured on the soundtrack of the 1996 film Twister.

Personnel
 John Rzeznik – lead and rhythm guitar, lead and backing vocals
 Robby Takac – bass guitar, backing vocals, lead vocals on tracks 2, 5, 8, 10, and 13
 George Tutuska – drums

Charts

Weekly charts

Year-end charts

Certifications and sales

References

Goo Goo Dolls albums
1995 albums
Warner Records albums
Metal Blade Records albums
Albums produced by Lou Giordano
Obscenity controversies in music